The 2016 Blackburn with Darwen Borough Council election took place on 5 May 2016 to elect members of Blackburn with Darwen Borough Council in England. This was the same day as other local elections.

The elections saw a gain of two seats by the Conservative Party from the Labour Party.

The resulting balance on the council after the elections was:

Labour 44

Conservative 16

Liberal Democrat 3

Independent 1

Election Result

After the election, the composition of the council was as follows:

|-
!colspan=2|Parties
!Seats
!Previous
!NetGain/Loss
|-
| 
|44||46||-2
|-
| 
|16||14||+2
|-
| 
|3||3||0
|-
|
|align=left|Independent
|1||1||0
|-
!colspan=2|Total!!64!!64
|}

Council Composition
Prior to the election the composition of the council was:

After the election, the composition of the council was:

I - Independent

Ward Results

Audley

Bastwell

Beardwood with Lammack

Corporation Park

Earcroft

Ewood

Fernhurst

Higher Croft

Little Harwood

Livesey with Pleasington

Marsh House

Meadowhead

Mill Hill

North Turton with Tockholes

Queen's Park

Roe Lee

Shadsworth with Whitebirk

Shear Brow

Sudell

Sunnyhurst

Wensley Fold

Whitehall

References

2016 English local elections
2016
2010s in Lancashire